Koviljkin grad or Koviljka is a name for archaeological ruins close to Banja Koviljača in the Loznica district of western Serbia. The ruins are of a Roman town, which may have been named Gensis; the name has never been confirmed. It is located on the top of a hill, and the remains of the walls spread about 150 metres around it.

At the time of the Roman Empire, the river Drina flowed underneath this settlement, and it is believed that there was a Roman river harbour.

The site has not been completely explored by archaeologists.

Gallery

See also
Vidin Grad
Trojanov Grad
Gensis (vicus)
Museum in Loznica

References
Aleksandar Deroko, "Medieval cities in Serbia, Montenegro and Macedonia, Belgrade, 1950.
Slobodan Dušanič, "Roman Mining in Illyricum – Historical Aspects"
Massimiliano Pavan, "From the Adriatic to the Danube" Padova, 1991.

Loznica
Archaeological sites in Serbia
Roman sites in Serbia
Roman towns and cities in Serbia
Ruins in Serbia